Marjeta Šašel Kos (born 20 April 1954) is a Slovene archaeologist and classical philologist.

Biography 
Marjeta Šašel Kos was born on 20 April 1954. In 1980, she earned a master's degree in archaeology from the University of Ljubljana, and in 1989 a PhD in classical philology from the same university.

Since 1987, she has worked as a researcher at the Institute of Archaeology of the Research Centre of the Slovenian Academy of Sciences and Arts (ZRC SAZU).

Works

References 

Living people
1954 births